The Women's 800 metres T54 event at the 2012 Summer Paralympics took place at the London Olympic Stadium from 4 to 5 September. The event consisted of 3 heats and a final.

Records
Prior to the competition, the existing World and Paralympic records were as follows:

Results

Round 1
Competed 4 September 2012 from 10:12. Qual. rule: winner of each heat (Q) plus best second place (q) qualified.

Heat 1

Heat 2

Heat 3

Final
Competed 5 September 2012 at 21:44.

 
Q = qualified by place. q = qualified by time. RR = Regional Record. PB = Personal Best. SB = Seasonal Best.

References

Athletics at the 2012 Summer Paralympics
2012 in women's athletics
Women's sport in London